Levi McKeen Arnold (L.M. Arnold) (b. February 12, 1813 Poughkeepsie, New York - d. September 27, 1864 Poughkeepsie, New York) was a successful businessman (a foundry manager) and banker in New York who claimed to have received revelations from Jesus Christ beginning in the Spring of 1851, first published in 1852 in a book entitled History of the Origin of All Things.

{{quote|The preparatory revelations commenced April 5, 1851, in the form of movements of the pencil, answers to questions, and words internally heard. Such writings were continued for a year and a few days, when the first book of The History of the Origin of All Things was commenced in a small bound blank book written with lead pencil throughout...<ref>"L.M. Arnold: A Sketch", page 11 of [http://www.thehistoryofallthings.com/PDFFiles/The%20History%20of%20the%20Origin%20of%20All%20Things.pdf History of the Origin..." published at historyofallthings.com]</ref> }}

The text of History of the Origin seemingly endorses modern spiritualism of the type popularized beginning in 1848 upon publication of the claims of the Fox sisters, but cautions against indiscriminate access to other realms.

A sketchy biography of Arnold is included in an archived version of the website thehistoryofallthings.com. Arnold's work is endorsed in a similar work published in 1908 by Archie Johnson Inger. Likewise, Arnold's text commends the work of Rev. Charles C. Hammond, who published a collection of spiritualist articles Light from the Spirit World in Rochester, New York in 1852. (An apparent companion volume published at the same time is Light From the Spirit World: The Pilgrimage of Thomas Paine, and others, to the Seventh Circle in the Spirit World''.)

Arnold's text states that the New Jerusalem began to alight on planet Earth on July 4, 1776, and predicts that religious freedom would be 'extinguished' in Europe after 1851, but would find refuge in the United States.

Arnold's parents were Benjamin Arnold and Helen Maria McKeen, and he married Susan Robinson in 1844. A descendant of his, Benjamin L. Arnold published a photograph of L.M. Arnold's gravestone online in March 2008.

References

External links 

 The History of Health and its Derangements  by Divine revelation delivered to L.M. Arnold
 The Life of Jesus of Nazareth Spiritually Given by His Spirit through L.M. Arnold

1813 births
1864 deaths
Businesspeople from New York (state)
Writers from Poughkeepsie, New York
19th-century American businesspeople